Waukegan Community Unit School District 60 (also known as Waukegan Public Schools or District 60, WCUSD) is in Waukegan, Illinois, and serves Waukegan, Park City, and parts of Beach Park. Total enrollment is approximately 16,000 in kindergarten through grade twelve. District 60 also provides pre-school and alternative education services.

Waukegan Public Schools is led by Superintendent Theresa Plascencia. Administrative offices are at the Lincoln Center for Education.

History 

During the mid-1800s, the residents of Waukegan created a citywide school system. By 1856, North School opened, becoming the first and now oldest building in the District.

Schools
District 60 operates 15 elementary schools, 5 middle schools, a high school (divided between two buildings), a kindergarten center, 1 pre-kindergarten site, and an alternative education center.

Elementary (K-5 and 1-5)
Carman-Buckner Elementary School
John S. Clark Elementary School
Clearview Elementary School
Andrew Cooke Magnet School
Glen Flora Elementary School
Glenwood Elementary School
Greenwood Elementary School
Hyde Park Elementary School
Little Fort Elementary School
Lyon Magnet School
H. R. McCall Elementary School
North Elementary School
Oakdale Elementary School
Washington Elementary School
Whittier Elementary School

Middle Schools (6-8)
Robert Abbott Middle School
Jack Benny Middle School - named for comedian Jack Benny (1894-1974)
Thomas Jefferson Middle School
Miguel Juarez Middle School - formerly East Middle School
Edith M. Smith Middle School - formerly Daniel Webster Middle School

High School (9-12)
Waukegan High School

Other Schools
Alternative Optional Education Center
EPIC Academy Preschool
North Shore Preschool
Shiloh Preschool

2014 Teachers Strike
On October 2, 2014, after months of negotiating between the WCUSD Teachers union and the School board, the teachers authorized a strike. At midnight October 2, the teachers were now on strike after failing to reach a deal. Schools were closed during the strike, which lasted one month; classes resumed on Monday, November 3.

See also
List of school districts in Illinois

References

External links
Waukegan Community Unit School District 60 Web Site

School districts in Lake County, Illinois
Waukegan, Illinois
1856 establishments in Illinois
School districts established in 1856